Andre Marquette Lott (born May 31, 1979) is an American football strong safety most recently with the Pittsburgh Steelers of the National Football League.  He played college football at the University of Tennessee and was drafted in the fifth round of the 2002 NFL Draft by the Washington Redskins and retired in 2007.  Lott is a member of Kappa Alpha Psi fraternity. Lott is currently head football coach at St. George Memphis TN. He is married to Ashley and they reside in Memphis with their two dogs, Hazel and Jax.

References 

1979 births
Living people
American football safeties
People from Memphis, Tennessee
People from Savannah, Tennessee
Pittsburgh Steelers players
San Diego Chargers players
Tennessee Volunteers football players
Washington Redskins players